Alexis Rannit (born  Alexey Konstantinovich Dolgoshev - Алексей Константинович Долгошев; Estonian: Aleksis Rannit; 14 October 1914 – 5 January 1985) was an Estonian poet, critic and literature researcher.

Biography 
He was born in Kallaste, in the Governorate of Livonia of the Russian Empire (nowadays in Tartumaa, Estonia). He spent his childhood in Saint Petersburg. In 1939, he graduated from the University of Tartu. He studied applied arts. He did research on Lithuanian literature and knew personally many Lithuanian authors. From 1938 to 1940 he worked as a correspondent of the Riga newspaper Segodnya.

In 1940 he married Lithuanian opera singer Gražina Matulaitytė (1899–1993), moved to Kaunas, where he worked until 1941 as a translator at the Kaunas State Drama Theatre, and later as a librarian at the Lithuanian National Library (until 1944).

In 1944, as the Red Army was approaching, Rannit emigrated to Germany, where he continued with his studies at the Institute of applied arts in Freiburg (1946–1950).

In 1953 he moved to the US. He remarried. From 1954 to 1960 he worked as librarian in the Art and Architecture division of the New York Public Library.

In 1956 he defended his master's thesis on arts history (annotated critical biography of Ciurlionis) at the Columbia University (New York). He worked as a research fellow and curator of Slavic and Eastern European collections at the University of Yale. Rannit was honorary doctor of a number of European (incl. University of Stockholm), American and Korean universities, founding member of International Association of Arts Critics, represented the Estonian authors at the PEN club, belonged to the editorial staff of Continent.

Аlexis Rannit died on 5 January 1985 in New Haven, Connecticut, USA.

Works 
Rannit started writing poems in Russian, since 1930 wrote in Estonian. Rannit translated Lithuanian poets' works into Estonian. He has published seven collections of poetry. Rannit's works have been translated into English, Russian, Hungarian, Lithuanian and German language.

External links
Aleksis Rannit Papers. General Collection, Beinecke Rare Book and Manuscript Library, Yale University.

References

1914 births
1985 deaths
People from Peipsiääre Parish
People from the Governorate of Livonia
Estonian male poets
Literary historians
20th-century Estonian poets
20th-century Estonian historians
20th-century male writers
Writers from New Haven, Connecticut
Columbia University alumni
Estonian emigrants to the United States
Estonian World War II refugees